Urchin clingfish may refer one of two species of gobiesocid fishes:

 Dellichthys morelandi
 Diademichthys lineatus